"Find Me" is a song by American electronic music producer and DJ Marshmello, it was released from his debut studio album Joytime, released on January 8, 2016 via Joytime Collective.

Music video
The music video was released on August 5, 2017. According to the description by Huch Flynn of We Rave You, it sets that Marshmello joins a college party, he "keeps his eyes targeted on the younger audience". Subsequently he "goes from being teased to becoming the life of the party". Reviewer also praised the video "combine[s] a ton of Twinkies, dancing, partying, and a powerful feeling of unity, the “Find Me” music video might be [his] best design yet."

Charts

Weekly charts

Year-end charts

References

2016 songs
Marshmello songs